Rolf Zetterlund (born 2 January 1942) is a Swedish former football player and manager.

He played for Atvidabergs FF, Sandvikens IF, AIK and IK Brage. He obtained the Swedish Football player of the year award the same he retired as a player, in 1980, at the age of 38. He never played for the Swedish national team.

He coached IK Brage, AIK, Örebro SK, Spårvägens FF, Malmö FF, Hammarby IF, Vasalunds IF, Vallentuna BK and Vasalund/Essinge IF.

References

External links
Profile at AIK

1942 births
Living people
Swedish footballers
Åtvidabergs FF players
AIK Fotboll players
Swedish football managers
AIK Fotboll managers
Örebro SK managers
Malmö FF managers
Hammarby Fotboll managers
IK Brage managers
Sandvikens IF players
IK Brage players
Vasalunds IF managers
Association football midfielders
Swedish bandy players
Sandvikens AIK players